Etiquette is the debut album by Australian punk rock band Something with Numbers. It was released in 2004, through Below Par Records.

Track listing
 "Prelude"
 "Words Mean Nothing"
 "Against the Wind"
 "Listen"
 "Crowner of Kings"
 "I'm Sorry I'm Wrong"
 "On the Inside"
 "Take My Life"
 "Far from a Fairy Tale"
 "Where I Used to Breathe"
 "The Last Thing on My Mind"
 "Falling Out of Touch"

2004 albums